A jade burial suit is a ceremonial suit made of pieces of jade in which royal members in Han dynasty China were buried.

Structure
Of the jade suits that have been found, the pieces of jade are mostly square or rectangular in shape, though triangular, trapezoid and rhomboid plaques have also been found.  Plaques are often joined by means of wire, threaded through small holes drilled near the corners of each piece.  The composition of the wire varies, and several suits have been found joined with either gold or silver.  Other suits, such as that of King Zhao Mo, were joined using silk thread, or silk ribbon that overlapped the edges of the plaques. In some instances, additional pieces of jade have been found beneath the head covering, including shaped plaques to cover the eyes, and plugs to fit the ears and nose.

According to the Book of Later Han, the type of wire used was dependent on the status of the person buried. The jade burial suits of emperors used gold thread; princes, princesses, dukes, and marquises, silver thread; sons or daughters of those given silver thread, copper thread; and lesser aristocrats, silk thread, with all others being forbidden to be buried in jade burial suits.  Examination of the known suits, such as the two found in Mancheng, has revealed that these rules were not always followed.  Considering the vast size of the country, and the relatively slow means of disseminating information, it is not surprising that the materials and techniques used in a jade burial suit occasionally differed from the official guidelines.

A jade burial suit was extremely expensive to create, and only wealthy aristocrats could afford to be buried in them.  Additionally, the process of manufacturing a suit was labor-intensive and is estimated to have required several years to complete a single suit.

History

Tombs from the Spring and Autumn period belonging to the dukes of the Jin state in Quwo were discovered in which the body was covered with small jade pieces once interwoven with silk.

For many years, many archaeologists suspected that records of jade burial suits were only legends. The discovery in 1968 of two complete jade suits in the tombs of Liu Sheng and Dou Wan in Mancheng, Hebei, finally proved their existence. The jade suits of Liu Sheng and Dou Wan consisted of 2,498 plates of solid jade connected with two and a half pounds of gold wires.

In 1973, a jade burial suit belonging to Prince Huai of the Western Han Dynasty was discovered in Dingxian, Hebei. It consisted of 1,203 pieces of jade and 2,580 grams of gold thread.

In 1983, a jade suit was found in the tomb of Zhao Mo, the second king of Southern Yue, in Guangzhou. The red silk thread used to bind the 2,291 jade plates represented Zhao Mo's immersion into local culture. It is exhibited in the local Museum of the Mausoleum of the Nanyue King.

In 1991, a jade burial suit was excavated from a group of monumental tombs of the King of Chu, Liu Wu, in Xuzhou. This magnificent,  life-sized jade and gold burial suit is the finest to have survived, thereby possessing a high value for artistic appreciation.

It is now believed that jade burial suits were actually relatively common among the wealthiest aristocrats of the Han Dynasty, but that over the years most have been lost due to the activities of grave robbers.

Gallery

See also
 Chinese jade

References

External links

 Chinese Civilization: Funerary Jade Armor —  Video on The China Times
 China.com.cn — Chinese language article on Jade burial suit, with photograph
 An Armor for Immortality
 Jade objects

Archaeology of death
Archaeological artifacts of China
Chinese art
Jade
Chinese inventions
Hardstone carving
Han dynasty culture